"Bright" is a song by American indie pop band Echosmith. It was released to American radio on February 2, 2015 by Warner Bros. Records as the second single from their debut studio album, Talking Dreams (2013). The song became the group's second top 40 hit on the Billboard Hot 100 and their second top-ten hit on the Adult Top 40 chart.

Composition

"Bright" is written in the key of Gb Major, and follows a chord progression of Gb-Ebm-Cb-Db (I-vi-IV-V). The tempo of the song is 90 beats per minute.

Music video
A music video to accompany the release of "Bright" was first released onto YouTube on February 12, 2015 at a total length of three minutes and 37 seconds. Sydney, Jamie, Noah and Graham are shown packing up for a camping trip. They arrived to see their friends and hiked up to their campsite. The group is excited to see the night sky. Nearing the end, at nightfall, they hiked up to see a meteor shower. The video ends with the word "bright" being shown as a constellation.

Track listing

Charts and certifications

Weekly charts

Year-end charts

Certifications

Release history

References

2015 singles
2013 songs
Echosmith songs
Songs written by Mozella
Warner Records singles
Songs written by Jamie Sierota